The Hungarian National Badminton Championships is a tournament organized to crown the best badminton players in Hungary.

The tournament started in 1960 and is held every year.

Past winners

References
Details of affiliated national organisations at Badminton Europe

Badminton tournaments in Hungary
National badminton championships
Recurring sporting events established in 1960
Sports competitions in Hungary